Lydham is a small village and civil parish in Shropshire, England.

Lydham is situated on the junction of the A488 and the A489 main roads, about 2 miles (3.2 km) north of Bishop's Castle.

There is a market held on Fridays in the village hall. Close by is the small village and separate parish of More.

History
Two miles to the south-east, in the parish of Lydham, are the fragmentary remains of Lea Castle, adjoining a modern farmhouse at Lower Lea.

Railway
Lydham was served by the now defunct Bishops Castle Railway which closed in 1935. The station was nearby at Lydham Heath.

See also
Listed buildings in Lydham

References

External links

www.geograph.co.uk : photos of Lydham and surrounding area

Villages in Shropshire
Civil parishes in Shropshire